Ferintosh is a hamlet in central Alberta, Canada within Camrose County. The hamlet is situated on Little Beaver Lake. The community takes its name from Ferintosh, in Scotland.

History 
Ferintosh incorporated as a village on January 9, 1911. It relinquished its village status on January 1, 2020 when it dissolved to become a hamlet under the jurisdiction of Camrose County.

Geography 
Nearby communities include:
 New Norway
 Edberg
 Bashaw
 Meeting Creek

Demographics 

See also 
List of communities in Alberta
List of former urban municipalities in Alberta
List of hamlets in Alberta

References

External links 

1911 establishments in Alberta
2020 disestablishments in Alberta
Designated places in Alberta
Former villages in Alberta
Hamlets in Alberta
Populated places disestablished in 2020